Psi Factor: Chronicles of the Paranormal is a Canadian science fiction drama television series which was filmed in and around Toronto, Ontario, Canada, and aired 88 episodes over four seasons from 1996 to 2000. The series is hosted by Dan Aykroyd who presents dramatic stories supposedly inspired by the paranormal investigations of the "Office of Scientific Investigation and Research" (O.S.I.R.).

Each episode in the first season, with the exception of two episodes, feature two unlinked cases in each episode. Beginning with the second season, each episode focused on one case, and the series began to feature story arcs alongside the standalone episodes.

Series overview

Episodes

Season 1 (1996–97)

Season 2 (1997–98)

Season 3 (1998–99)

Season 4 (1999–2000)

References

External links
 

Lists of science fiction television series episodes
Lists of Canadian television series episodes